The Yakovlev Yak-100 was a single-engine, transport helicopter developed in the USSR in 1948. This was the Yakovlev Design Bureau's second helicopter.

Design and development
The Yak-100 (initially designated Yak-22) was developed in direct competition with Mikhail Mil's Mi-1. Bearing a striking resemblance to the Sikorsky H-5, the Yak-100 had a conventional main and anti-torque rotor configuration, driven by an Ivchenko AI-26GRFL radial piston engine. The pilot and crewman/passenger sat under a long greenhouse-style canopy, with very good visibility.

Flight trials progressed quickly, with the almost ubiquitous vibration being tackled by moving the centre of gravity of the main rotor blades behind their flexural axes. Manufacturer's trials were completed in June 1950, with successful State acceptance trials following later that year.

Although successful in trials, the Yak-100 was not put into production because the equally successful Mi-1 had already been prepared for production before the Yak-100 had completed acceptance trials. The second prototype had three seats as well as other minor improvements.

Specifications (Yak-100)

See also

References

Further reading
 

1940s Soviet military transport aircraft
Abandoned military aircraft projects of the Soviet Union
Military helicopters
Yak-100
1940s Soviet helicopters
Single-engined piston helicopters
Aircraft first flown in 1948